Romain Cabannes (born 2 December 1984) is a French rugby union player. His position is centre and he currently plays for Castres Olympique in the Top 14. He began his career with his home town club, Stade Montois, before moving to Pau and on to Biarritz before settling at Castres in 2009.

Honours

Club 
 Castres
Top 14: 2012–13

References

1984 births
Living people
French rugby union players
People from Mont-de-Marsan
Biarritz Olympique players
Castres Olympique players
Rugby union centres
Sportspeople from Landes (department)